Miss Republic of the Philippines 2015-2016 is the revival of Miss Republic of the Philippines pageant that is once-popular national beauty pageant that first staged in 1969 under Ferdie Villar of Spotlight Promotions. The winner was chosen as the official delegate of the Philippines to the Miss World pageant.

After a 38-year hiatus, Miss Republic of the Philippines (Miss RP) is in its comeback under the new ownership of philanthropist, Lynette Padolina, CEO of the revived organization.

The international competition for the winner will be announced in 2nd quarter of 2016, aside from the cash prize and scholarship grant for a four-year college course or post-graduate studies and will tour extensively to promote Philippine tourism and culture. The quest is the equivalent of the Miss America scholarship pageant organization.

Placements

Result

Special Awards

References

External links
 https://www.facebook.com/Miss-Republic-of-the-Philippines-812859088797255/timeline/

Republic of the Philippines
2015 in the Philippines